HMS Camperdown was a  of the Royal Navy (RN). She was named after the Battle of Camperdown, a naval engagement between the British and Dutch that took place in 1797, and which resulted in a British victory.

She was built by Fairfields and launched on 8 February 1944 and commissioned on 18 June 1945.

Service
Camperdown was despatched to the Far East, joining the 19th Destroyer Flotilla of the British Pacific Fleet after VJ Day and so did not see action during the Second World War. In November 1946, Camperdown, along with the rest of the 19th Flotilla, returned to the United Kingdom, and was placed in reserve at Devonport in April 1947.

Camperdown was refitted from January to May 1950, and on 26 May 1953, was recommissioned for trials. She formed part of the Fleet Review on the Solent to celebrate the Coronation of Queen Elizabeth II on 15 June 1953 as part of the reserve fleet, a record of which can be found displayed on board the royal yacht .

Camperdown was refitted and modernised at Liverpool between 18 May 1956 and 29 October 1957. After trials, on 10 December 1957, the ship joined the 3rd Destroyer Squadron, which alternated between service with the Home Fleet and the Mediterranean Fleet, replacing , which had been withdrawn from use because of poor condition. On 21 September 1958, a fire broke out in Camperdowns boiler room while the destroyer was taking part in a NATO exercise, damaging electrical cables but causing no casualties. In 1960, Camperdown joined the 1st Destroyer Squadron, with spells with the Home and Mediterranean Fleets. In 1962, Camperdown was placed on the disposal list and in 1970, she was finally scrapped at Faslane.

References

Publications

 

Battle-class destroyers of the Royal Navy
Ships built in Govan
1944 ships
Cold War destroyers of the United Kingdom